Keisha Hampton (born February 22, 1990) is an American professional basketball player for the Chicago Sky of the Women's National Basketball Association (WNBA). She signed a training camp contract for the Connecticut Sun on April 1, 2014, but was waived prior to the start of the season. On March 30, 2016, she was signed by the Minnesota Lynx for the 2016 WNBA season. Prior to the 2017 WNBA season she was traded to the Chicago Sky.

Career statistics

WNBA

Regular season

|-
| align="left" | 2016
| align="left" | Minnesota
| 27 || 0 || 6.8 || .333 || .333 || .870 || 0.4 || 0.4 || 0.3 || 0.1 || 0.4 || 2.6
|-
| align="left" | 2017
| align="left" | Chicago
| 19 || 1 || 7.8 || .414 || .417 || 1.000 || 0.6 || 0.3 || 0.3 || 0.2 || 0.3 || 3.6
|-
| align="left" | Career
| align="left" | 2 years, 2 teams
| 46 || 1 || 7.2 || .374 || .375 || .897 || 0.5 || 0.3 || 0.3 || 0.1 || 0.3 || 3.0

Playoffs

|-
| align="left" | 2016
| align="left" | Minnesota
| 4 || 0 || 2.0 || .500 || .333 || .000 || 0.0 || 0.0 || 0.0 || 0.0 || 0.5 || 1.3
|-
| align="left" | Career
| align="left" | 1 year, 1 team
| 4 || 0 || 2.0 || .500 || .333 || .000 || 0.0 || 0.0 || 0.0 || 0.0 || 0.5 || 1.3

College statistics
Source

References

External links
USA Basketball: Keisha Hampton
Basketball has been in Keisha Hampton's blood from the start – ESPN

1990 births
Living people
American women's basketball players
Basketball players from Philadelphia
DePaul Blue Demons women's basketball players
Minnesota Lynx players
Chicago Sky players
Seattle Storm draft picks
Universiade gold medalists for the United States
Universiade medalists in basketball
Forwards (basketball)
Medalists at the 2011 Summer Universiade